Jafarbay-e Sharqi Rural District is a rural district (dehestan) in Gomishan District, Torkaman County, Golestan Province, Iran. At the 2006 census, its population was 15,891, in 3,178 families.  The rural district has 21 villages.

References 

Rural Districts of Golestan Province
Torkaman County